The 2011 Harlow District Council election took place on 5 May 2011 to elect members of Harlow District Council in Essex, England. One third of the council was up for election and the Conservative Party stayed in overall control of the council.

After the election, the composition of the council was:
Conservative 17
Labour 14
Liberal Democrats 2

Background
After the last election in 2010 the Conservatives controlled the council with 18 seats, compared to 10 for Labour and 5 for the Liberal Democrats. The Liberal Democrat group was reduced further in December 2010 when councillor Manny Doku of Bush Fair ward defected to Labour.

34 candidates stood for the 11 seats contested, with the Conservative and Labour group leaders, Andrew Johnson and Mark Wilkinson, defending seats in Church Langley and Harlow Common wards. The Liberal Democrats were defending 2 seats, but their group leader Chris Millington of Bush Fair ward stood down at the election. Conservative councillor Patrick McClarnon also stood down from his Great Parndon ward, while seats in Staple Tye and Sumners and Kingsmoor were vacant after Conservative councillors Lee and Sarah Dangerfield resigned from the council in November 2010.

Election result
The Conservatives remained in control of the council with 17 councillors, but Labour made 3 gains to move to 14 seats, while the Liberal Democrats dropped to 2 seats. The Labour gains meant they won 7 of the 11 seats contested in 2011, including taking Staple Tye which previously had been held by the Conservatives before the councillor had resigned from the council. Meanwhile, the Liberal Democrats lost both the seats they had been defending in Bush Fair and Mark Hall to Labour and lost vote share everywhere.

Ward results

Bush Fair

Church Langley

Great Parndon

Harlow Common

Little Parndon and Hare Street

Mark Hall

Netteswell

Old Harlow

Staple Tye

Summers and Kingsmoor

Toddbrook

References

Harlow District Council elections
2011 English local elections
2010s in Essex